Norma N. Bonniwell (Norma Bonniwell King) (1877–1961) was an American architect who worked with her father, George C. Bonniwell, in the firm of Bonniwell and Daughter in North Carolina. Her sister Josephine and brother James Gaither also worked in the business.

She lived in Hickory and Windsor, North Carolina. She married William Peele King, November 20, 1901. The couple settled in Windsor, North Carolina.

Norma Bonniwell is credited with design of one building that is listed on the U.S. National Register of Historic Places.

Works include:
Thomas B. Finley House, designed 1893, 1014 E St. North Wilkesboro, North Carolina (Bonniwell, Norma), NRHP-listed
A building at Lenoir College in Hickory, North Carolina
W. A. Thomas House, 302 West End Avenue, Statesville, North Carolina

References

19th-century American architects
American women architects
Architects from North Carolina
1877 births
1961 deaths
20th-century American architects
People from Windsor, North Carolina
20th-century American women
19th-century American women